Tejada may refer to:

Tejada (surname)
Tejada, Province of Burgos, Castile and León, Spain
Lerdo de Tejada (Monterrey Metro)
Puerto Tejada, Cauca, Colombia
Taifa of Tejada, medieval kingdom in modern Spain

See also
Tejeda (disambiguation)
Tejera (disambiguation)